The Okanogan Steamboat Company was a shipping company that ran steamboats on the Columbia River above Wenatchee, Washington from the late 19th century to 1915.  

Its steamboats  included Pringle, Chelan, and North Star.

See also
Steamboats of Columbia River, Wenatchee Reach

External links

Photographs
crew of sternwheeler post by lifeboat
company steamboats and town, circa 1910

References

Steamboats of the Columbia River